The Archdeacon of Bournemouth is a senior ecclesiastical officer within the Diocese of Winchester. As Archdeacon, he or she is responsible for the disciplinary supervision of the clergy within the archdeaconry, which consists of six deaneries in the southern part of the diocese: Bournemouth, Christchurch, Eastleigh, Lyndhurst, Romsey and Southampton. Before 2000, the title was Archdeacon of Winchester.

History
A similar area of the diocese was previously supervised by the ancient Archdeacons of Winchester, while the north (now the new Winchester archdeaconry) was previously overseen by the Archdeacon of Basingstoke.

List of archdeacons

High Medieval
Senior archdeacons in the Diocese of Winchester
bef. 1087–aft. 1078: William of Chichester
bef. 1107–bef. 1116 (res.): Henri I de Blois (later Bishop of Verdun)
bef. 1128–bef. 1139: Richard
bef. 1139–1142 (res.): Josceline de Bohon
bef. 1153–1153 (res.): Hugh de Puiset
Archdeacons of Winchester
bef. 1154–aft. 1178: Ralph
bef. 1181–aft. 1205: Roger (I)
bef. 1213–aft. 1229: Bartholomew
?–1231 (d.): Roger (II)
bef. 1236–aft. 1236: P. (I)
bef. 1237–1253 (d.): Hugh des Roches
bef. 1254–aft. 1256: P. (II)
bef. 1257–aft. 1261: Amaury Guiscard
aft. 1263–bef. 1275: Henry de Helingeye
bef. 1280–aft. 1283: Richard de la More
aft. 1285–aft. 1303: Philip of St Austell alias Cornwaleys

Late Medieval
10 June 1304 – 1304 (res.): Michael de Helleston
31 July 1304–aft. 1324: James Sinabaldi de Florentia or de Pulcis
1 April 1325–bef. 1328 (d.): Philip Sapiti
1328–1343 (d.): John de Podio Barzaco
1343–bef. 1345: Stephen de Malo Leone
1343: Ayquelinus Guillelmi de Sparra (opposed Malo Leone)
1345–bef. 1361 (d.): Robert de Burton
18 June 1361–bef. 1361 (res.): John de Wolveleye
18 October 1361–bef. 1372 (res.): Robert de Wykford
19 October 1372 – 29 November 1381 (res.): Nicholas de Wykeham
27 March 1382–bef. 1387 (d.): John Bloxham
bef. 1386–23 February 1389 (ren): William Forrester (opposed Bloxham)
1387–1395 (res.): Roger Walden
16 October 1395–aft. 1404: Nicholas Daniel
bef. 1428–aft. 1435: Nicholas Bildeston (simultaneously Dean of Salisbury for part of that time)
?–bef. 1450 (res.): Stephen Wilton
21 February 1450–bef. 1459 (res.): John Pakenham
24 July 1459–bef. 1475 (d.): Vincent Clement
5 March 1475 – 1478 (res.): John Morton
bef. 1485–1486 (res.): Robert Morton
22 February 1487 – 1492: William Smyth
bef. 1495–bef. 1502 (res.): Robert Frost
29 April 1502 – 8 October 1511 (res.): John Frost
22 October 1511 – 20 March 1520 (res.): Hugh Ashton
27 March 1520–March 1527 (exch.): John Fox
March 1527–31 December 1529 (res.): Richard Pate
20 January 1530–October 1551 (d.): William Boleyn

Early modern
1552–bef. 1554 (deprived): John Philpot (deprived in 1554 and burnt for heresy, 18 December 1555)
12 March 1554–bef. 1572 (d.): Stephen Cheston
1 June 1572–bef. 1575 (res.): John Ebden
29 March 1575 – 26 August 1609 (d.): Michael Reniger
1609–20 July 1631 (d.): Ralph Barlow (also Dean of Wells from 1621)
22 September 1631 – 2 June 1653 (d.): Edward Burby
1660–bef. 1661 (d.): George Roberts
16 March 1661–bef. 1666 (res.): Thomas Gorges
26 April 1666 – 29 March 1684 (d.): Walter Dayrell
18 April–11 July 1684 (d.): Robert Sharrock
29 July 1684–bef. 1700 (d.): Thomas Clutterbuck
16 November 1700–bef. 1702 (d.): George Fulham
26 November 1702 – 25 March 1743 (d.): Ralph Brideoake
12 April 1743–bef. 1749 (res.): Robert Eden
20 April 1749 – 10 April 1750 (res.): Nicholas Lechmere
21 August 1750–bef. 1756 (res.): Robert Lowth
17 January 1756 – 11 July 1759 (d.): Robert Eden (again)
23 July 1759 – 19 January 1795 (d.): Thomas Balguy
6 July 1795 – 30 September 1807 (d.): Matthew Woodford
18 December 1807 – 11 August 1814 (res.): Thomas de Grey
2 September 1814 – 6 December 1819 (res.): Augustus Legge
9 December 1819 – 19 October 1829 (d.): Gilbert Heathcote
16 November 1829–bef. 1847 (res.): Charles Hoare
16 November 1847 – 1860 (res.): Joseph Wigram

Late modern
1860–20 December 1884 (d.): Philip Jacob
1884–1900 (res.): George Sumner (also Bishop suffragan of Guildford from 1888)
1901–19 February 1903 (d.): Arthur Lyttelton (also Bishop suffragan of Southampton since 1898)
1903–1920 (ret.): William Fearon
1920–29 October 1935 (d.): Alfred Daldy
1936–1943 (res.): Edmund Morgan
1943–1947 (res.): Hedley Burrows
1947–1962 (ret.): Leslie Lang, Assistant Bishop
1962–1973 (ret.): Roy Beynon (afterwards archdeacon emeritus)
1973–1984 (res.): David Cartwright
1984–1999 (ret.): Alan Clarkson (afterwards archdeacon emeritus)
1999–2000: Adrian Harbidge (became Archdeacon of Bournemouth)
In 2000, the ancient archdeaconry was renamed Bournemouth; the old Basingstoke archdeaconry was renamed Winchester.
Archdeacons of Bournemouth
2000–2010 (ret.): Adrian Harbidge (previously Archdeacon of Winchester)
2011–2020 (res.): Peter Rouch
During 2021, rather than fill the Archdeaconry of Bournemouth, it was given to the Archdeacon of Winchester in plurality.

References

Sources

Anglican ecclesiastical offices
 
 
Lists of Anglicans
Lists of English people